Faizan Khan can refer to:

 Faizan Khan (Indian cricketer), an Indian cricketer
 Faizan Khan (Pakistani cricketer) (born 1992), a Pakistani cricketer